Darryl Meadows (born February 15, 1961) is a former American football defensive back. He played for the Houston Oilers from 1983 to 1985.

References

1961 births
Living people
American football defensive backs
Toledo Rockets football players
Houston Oilers players